In countries whose armies are organised on a regimental basis, such as the army of the United Kingdom, a regimental museum is a military museum dedicated to the history of a specific army regiment.

List of regimental museums in the UK
In addition to those listed below, many more units (including Yeomanry, Militia and Volunteer regiments) have museums or exhibition spaces, some open only by appointment; for fuller information see the Ogilby Trust website (below).

England
The Army Medical Services Museum is based at Mytchett in Surrey
The Museum of Barnstaple and North Devon (for the Royal Devon Yeomanry, Royal 1st Devon Yeomanry and the Royal North Devon Yeomanry) is based in Barnstaple
The Bedfordshire and Hertfordshire Regiment gallery is part of Wardown Park Museum in Luton
The Border Regiment and its successors have a gallery at Cumbria's Museum of Military Life in Carlisle Castle
The Buffs (Royal East Kent Regiment) still has some exhibits at Beany House, although most of the collection was subsumed into the National Army Museum in 2000
The Cheshire Military Museum (for The Cheshire Regiment, 3rd Carabiniers, 5th Royal Inniskilling Dragoon Guards and Cheshire Yeomanry) is based at Chester Castle
The Devonshire and Dorset regimental collections are displayed in the Keep Military Museum, Dorchester 
The Duke of Cornwall's Light Infantry regimental collections are displayed at Cornwall's Regimental Museum at Victoria Barracks in Bodmin
The Duke of Wellington's Regiment Museum is based at Bankfield House, in Halifax, Yorkshire
The DLI Museum in Durham closed in 2016
 The East Yorkshire regimental collection is housed in Wilberforce House, Hull.
 The Essex Regiment Museum is based at Oaklands Park in Chelmsford
Firepower – The Royal Artillery Museum was based at Woolwich until it closed in 2016
The Fusilier Museum (Lancashire) is based in Bury, Greater Manchester
The Fusiliers Museum (London) is based in the Tower of London
The Fusiliers Museum of Northumberland is based in Alnwick Castle
The Soldiers of Gloucestershire Museum (Gloucestershire Regiment and Royal Gloucestershire Hussars) is based at the historic docks in Gloucester
The Green Howards Regimental Museum is based in Richmond, North Yorkshire
The Guards Museum is based at Wellington Barracks in London
The Gurkha Museum is based at Peninsula Barracks in Winchester
The Herefordshire Light Infantry Museum is based in Hereford
The Honourable Artillery Company Museum is at Armoury House in London
HorsePower: The Museum of the King's Royal Hussars is based at Peninsula Barracks in Winchester
The Household Cavalry Museum is based at Horse Guards in London
The Inns of Court & City Yeomanry Museum is based at Stone Buildings in London
The Kent and Sharpshooters Yeomanry Museum is at Hever Castle, Kent
The King's Own Royal Regiment Museum is part of the Lancaster City Museum in Lancaster
The King's Own Scottish Borderers Regimental Museum, is based at Berwick Barracks in Berwick-upon-Tweed
The Kings Own Yorkshire Light Infantry Museum is based at Doncaster Museum and Art Gallery in Doncaster
The King's Regiment Museum collection is displayed in the Museum of Liverpool
The Museum of the 14th/20th King's Hussars was in the Museum of Lancashire in Preston until it closed in 2016
The Lancashire Infantry Museum (for the Duke of Lancaster's Regiment and the Queen's Lancashire Regiment) is based at Fulwood Barracks in Preston
The Museum of the Adjutant General's Corps is based at Peninsula Barracks in Winchester
The Museum of the Manchesters was based at Ashton Town Hall but remains closed while the town hall is being redeveloped
The Middlesex Regiment museum, formerly in Bruce Castle, closed in 1992 and was absorbed into the National Army Museum
The Newcastle Discovery Museum includes the regimental museum of the Light Dragoons and the Northumberland Hussars
The Museum of the Northamptonshire Regiment is based at Abington Park
The Soldiers of Oxfordshire Museum (for the Oxfordshire and Buckinghamshire Light Infantry and the Queen's Own Oxfordshire Hussars) is based at Woodstock, Oxfordshire 
The Parachute Regiment and Airborne Forces Museum is based at Duxford, Cambridgeshire
The Queen's & Princess of Wales's Royal Regiment Regimental Museum is based at Dover Castle
The Queen's Own Hussars Museum is based at Lord Leycester Hospital in Warwick
The Queen's Own Royal West Kent Regiment Museum is based at Maidstone Museum & Art Gallery in Maidstone
The Rifles Museum is based at Peninsula Barracks in Winchester
The Rifles Berkshire and Wiltshire Museum is based in Salisbury
The Royal Anglian Regiment Museum is based at Duxford in Cambridgeshire
The REME Museum is based at MoD Lyneham
The Royal Engineers Museum is based at Gillingham in Kent
The Royal Green Jackets (Rifles) Museum is based at Peninsula Barracks in Winchester
The Royal Hampshire Regiment Museum is based at Lower Barracks in Winchester
The Royal Lancers and Nottinghamshire Yeomanry Museum is based at Thoresby Hall in Nottinghamshire
The Royal Leicestershire Regiment Museum is part of Newarke Houses Museum in Leicester
The Royal Lincolnshire Regiment and Lincolnshire Yeomanry collections are displayed in Lincoln's Museum of Lincolnshire Life
The Royal Logistic Corps Museum is based at Princess Royal Barracks near Camberley in Surrey
The Royal Marines Museum is in the course of relocating to Portsmouth Dockyard
The Royal Norfolk Regimental Museum is based in Norwich Castle
The Royal Regiment of Fusiliers Museum (Royal Warwickshire) is based at St John's House in Warwick
The Royal Signals Museum is based at Blandford Camp in Dorset
The Royal Sussex Regiment Museum and that of the Queen's Royal Irish Hussars is based at Eastbourne Redoubt in Sussex
The Sherwood Foresters Museum is based in Nottingham Castle
The Shropshire Regimental Museum is based at Shrewsbury Castle
The Soldier's Story Gallery (for the Sherwood Foresters (Nottingham and Derbyshire) Regiment, the 9th/12th Royal Lancers and the Derbyshire Yeomanry) is based at Derby Museum and Art Gallery
The Somerset Military Museum is based at Taunton Castle
The Staffordshire Regiment Museum is based at Whittington Barracks near Lichfield
The Suffolk Regiment Museum is based at Gibraltar Barracks in Bury St Edmunds
The Surrey Infantry Museum was based at Clandon Park House, near Guildford until it was destroyed in a fire in April 2015
The Tank Museum, the museum of the Royal Tank Regiment, is at Bovington Camp in Dorset
The Worcester Soldier galleries (for the Worcestershire Regiment and the Queen's Own Worcestershire Hussars) is part of the Worcester City Art Gallery & Museum
The York and Lancaster Regimental Museum is based at Clifton Park in Rotherham
The York Army Museum (for the Royal Dragoon Guards, Prince of Wales's Own Regiment of Yorkshire and the Yorkshire Regiment) is based at the Tower Street drill hall in York

Northern Ireland
The Royal Irish Fusiliers Museum is based in Armagh
The Royal Ulster Rifles Museum is based in Belfast
The Inniskillings Museum (for the Royal Inniskilling Fusiliers and the 5th Royal Inniskilling Dragoon Guards) is based at Enniskillen Castle

Scotland
The Gordon Highlanders Museum is based in Aberdeen
The Royal Scots Dragoon Guards Museum is based at Edinburgh Castle
The Museum of the Royal Scots (The Royal Regiment) and the Royal Regiment of Scotland is based at Edinburgh Castle
The Argyll and Sutherland Highlanders Regimental Museum is based at Stirling Castle
The Highlanders' Museum (for the Queen's Own Highlanders (Seaforth and Camerons)) is based at Fort George
The Black Watch Museum is based at Balhousie Castle in Perth
 The Royal Highland Fusilier Museum (for the Royal Scots Fusiliers and the Highland Light Infantry) is based at Sauchiehall Street in Glasgow
 The Cameronians Museum is part of the Low Parks Museum in Hamilton, South Lanarkshire

Wales
The Royal Welch Fusiliers Museum is based at Caernarfon Castle
The Regimental Museum of The Royal Welsh (for the South Wales Borderers and the Monmouthshire Regiment) is based at The Barracks, Brecon 
Firing Line: Cardiff Castle Museum of the Welsh Soldier (for the 1st The Queen's Dragoon Guards and the Royal Welsh) is based at Cardiff Castle
The regimental museum of the Royal Monmouthshire Royal Engineers is based in Monmouth Castle

References

External links
Ogilby Trust listing of British Army museums

Types of museums
Lists of museums by subject
Military and war museums